César Jorge Barros Luther (23 June 1912 – 1992) was a Chilean fencer. He competed in the individual foil and team épée events at the 1936 Summer Olympics.

References

1912 births
1992 deaths
Chilean male foil fencers
Olympic fencers of Chile
Fencers at the 1936 Summer Olympics
Sportspeople from Santiago
Chilean male épée fencers
20th-century Chilean people